"I Get Weak" is a song by American singer Belinda Carlisle from her second studio album, Heaven on Earth (1987). The song was written by Diane Warren and produced by Rick Nowels, and was released as the second single from Heaven on Earth in January 1988.

"I Get Weak" reached number two on the US Billboard Hot 100 behind Rick Astley's "Never Gonna Give You Up", and number ten on the UK Singles Chart in 1988. It also reached number four in Canada.

Background
After completing the song, songwriter Diane Warren "initially had Stevie Nicks in mind – a suggestion she made to producer Rick Nowels, who felt it would be a better fit for Carlisle."

Music video
The accompanying music video for the song features a combination of color and black-and-white shots in the same frames. It was directed by Academy Award-winning actress Diane Keaton (who also directed her previous "Heaven is a Place on Earth" video), and featured model and actor Tony Ward, who later appeared in Madonna's "Justify My Love" music video.

The video uses the single edit (4:20).

Track listing
"I Get Weak" (12" version) – 7:25
"I Get Weak" (7" version) – 4:39
"I Get Weak" (Instrumental version) (US pressing) – 7:32
"Should I Let You In?" – 4:16

The remixes were made by Shep Pettibone.

Charts

Weekly charts

Year-end charts

References

External links
 Belinda Carlisle - I Get Weak music video posted on YouTube by Universal Music Group.

1987 songs
1988 singles
2008 singles
Belinda Carlisle songs
MCA Records singles
Song recordings produced by Rick Nowels
Songs written by Diane Warren